Esik ( (Esık), also spelled Issyk, Yesik and Yesyk) is a town in Almaty Region of Kazakhstan, the administrative center of Enbekshikazakh District. It is located on the Issyk River, at the foot of the Tian Shan, 53 km east of Almaty and 112 km over the mountains from Issyk Kul Lake. Population:  

It was founded by Cossacks in 1858 as stanitsa Nadezhdinskaya. The Issyk kurgan of the famous "Golden Man" is nearby.

The nearby Issyk Lake (not to be confused with the much greater Issyk Kul Lake in Kyrgyzstan) is mostly famous for the way it was created (as a result of an ancient natural landslide damming a valley), destroyed (another natural landslide destroying that dam in 1963, with a subsequent damage to the city of Esik as well), and re-created (with human help).

Enterprises 

There are large enterprises such as "Koktem", "Esik Wine Factory", "Dionys", "Eles", "FoodMaster","Gold Produkt". In addition, construction, transport, etc. institutions and small industrial enterprises.

Notes

Populated places in Almaty Region
Populated places established in 1858
1858 establishments in the Russian Empire